Styal (like style) is a village and civil parish on the River Bollin near Wilmslow, Cheshire, England.

History
Styal village grew during the early years of the Industrial Revolution when industrialist Samuel Greg built a  cotton mill and textile factory, Quarry Bank Mill. The mill was situated on the bank of the River Bollin in order to use the water current to power the waterwheels. By the 1820s, the mill was expanding, and because of its rural location,  Greg found the need to construct a new model village nearby to provide housing for his workers.

Samuel Greg died in 1834 and Quarry Bank Mill was taken over by his son, Robert Hyde Greg, who remained in charge for nearly 40 years and introduced a number of technological innovations. Ownership of the mill subsequently passed through several generations of the Greg Family.

In 1898 the Styal Cottage Homes were opened to house destitute children from the Manchester area.

Landmarks

Quarry Bank Mill and its village still stand today; the mill ceased operation as a working factory in 1959 and is now owned by National Trust, who operate it as an industrial heritage museum.

The mill and its surrounding buildings are recorded in the National Heritage List for England as a designated Grade II* listed building.

Quarry Bank Mill has been recognised internationally as a significant industrial heritage site and has been included on the European Route of Industrial Heritage by the European Union's Creative Europe programme, which records the mill with Styal village as "the most complete and least altered factory colony of the Industrial Revolution. It is of outstanding national and international importance".

Norcliffe Chapel, a small Grade II-listed Unitarian chapel, stands close to the mill village. It was built in 1822–23 to provide a place of worship for the mill workers and is now in the ownership of the National Trust. It was originally established as a Baptist chapel, but was changed to a Unitarian church by Samuel Greg, himself a Unitarian, in 1833.

The Greg family were influential landowners in the area, and in 1831, Robert Hyde Greg commissioned the construction of a large new home, Norcliffe Hall, to the west of the village. Today, the Grade II-listed building is occupied by private flats.

Near to Norcliffe chapel stands the Grade II-listed Styal Cross, a wayside cross of medieval origin. The cross had originally stood at Cross Farm. In 1860 it was relocated by the son of Samuel Greg, Robert Hyde Greg, to Holly Lane. In 1980, it was demolished by a car crash. The remains of the lower part were rebuilt on the lane close to Styal Village in 1983, and after a fundraising campaign, a replacement stone column and cross were added to the medieval base in 2010.

The state primary school is on the Styal National Trust estate.

Today the former buildings of the Styal Cottage Homes (which closed in 1956) are occupied by the HMP Styal women's prison, which opened in 1962.

Demography

Population
The population in the 2001 Census was 5,014, including the nearby smaller village of Morley and part of the fringe of Wilmslow. The population for the civil parish according to the 2011 Census was 1,051.

According to 2001 Census data, the Morley and Styal Ward has a population of 5014, of which 2722 (54.3%) are females and 2292 (45.7%) are males. 949 people (18.93%) are aged 16 and under, and 969 people (19.33%) are aged 65 and over.

Ethnicity
Ethnic white groups (British, Irish, other) account for 96.19% (4823 people) of the population, with 3.81% (190 people) being in ethnic groups other than white.

Of the 3.81% (190 people) in non-white ethnic groups:
53 (27.89%) belonged to mixed ethnic groups
67 (35.26%) were Asian or Asian British
25 (13.16%) were Black or Black British
45 (23.64%) were Chinese or Other Ethnic Groups

Religion
A breakdown of religious groups and denominations:
Christian – 76.31% (3826 people)
Buddhist – 0.24% (12 people)
Hindu – 0.50% (25 people)
Jewish – 0.76% (38 people)
Muslim – 1.18% (59 people)
Sikh – 0.18% (9 people)
Sivesh – 0.02% (1 person)
Other religions – 0.26% (13 people)
No religion – 13.82% (693 people)
Religion not stated – 6.76% (339 people)

Transport
Styal is a commuter village, with transport access to Manchester. The line opened on 1 May 1909. A campaign was launched in 2008 to lobby for more services. Sunday services every two hours were launched in May 2009 to coincide with the line's centenary.

Notable people
 Tyson Fury (born 1988), professional boxer. Grew up in Styal.
 Terry Waite (born 1939), humanitarian, author, and hostage negotiator. Grew up in Styal.

See also

Listed buildings in Wilmslow
Styal Cottage Homes

References

External links

Quarry Bank Mill & Styal Estate
Styal Station Promotion Website
Styal Cottage Homes

Villages in Cheshire